Karen O'Connor is an Irish lawyer who has been a judge of the High Court since 2021. She was a Circuit Court judge between 2014 and 2021 and was previously a barrister practising criminal law.

Early life 
O'Connor was educated at Trinity College Dublin and the King's Inns.

Legal career 
She was called to the Bar in 1993. During her career as a barrister she frequently appeared in criminal trials, often prosecuting on behalf of the Director of Public Prosecutions. She acted in cases involving sexual offences, drug offences, theft, murder and assault.

Judicial career

Circuit Court 
O'Connor became a judge of the Circuit Court in November 2014. She presided over criminal trials in the Circuit Court. She was initially not assigned to a circuit and heard cases in Galway. She was assigned to the Dublin Circuit between 2017 and 2021.

O'Connor was the presiding judge in the criminal trials of Tom Humphries in 2017 and David Drumm in 2018. The Drumm trial lasted for 16 weeks.

High Court 
The Irish government agreed to nominate her to become a judge of the High Court in November 2021. She was appointed on 6 December 2021.

References

Living people
Year of birth missing (living people)
High Court judges (Ireland)
Irish women judges
Alumni of Trinity College Dublin
Alumni of King's Inns
21st-century Irish judges
21st-century women judges
Circuit Court (Ireland) judges